Atlanta fragilis is a species of sea snail, a holoplanktonic marine gastropod mollusk in the family Atlantidae.

Distribution

Description 
The maximum recorded shell length is 3 mm.

Habitat 
Minimum recorded depth is 30 m. Maximum recorded depth is 250 m.

References

Atlantidae
Gastropods described in 1993